Sånger om oss is a 2013 Lisa Nilsson studio album.

Track listing
Var är du min vän? (Andreas Mattsson)
Sången om oss (Lisa Nilsson, Peter LeMarc)
Min tid i dina händer (Lisa Nilsson, Mattias Torell)
Tillbaka (Lisa Nilsson, Henrik Janson)
Kom hem (Lisa Nilsson, Mattias Torell)
Det säger ingenting om oss (Lisa Nilsson, Mattias Torell)
Du, kom lite närmare (Lisa Nilsson, Mattias Torell)
När en människa faller (Lisa Nilsson, Mattias Torell)
Full måne (Lisa Nilsson, Mattias Torell)
Allting går över (Lisa Nilsson, Mattias Torell)
Dåliga dagar (Lisa Nilsson, Mattias Torell)
Och månen såg på (Lisa Nilsson, Peter Hallström)

Contributors
Lisa Nilsson - singer, producer
Pål Svenre - keyboard, producer
Nicci Notini - drums
Peter Forss - bass
Mattias Torell - guitar
Niklas Medin - keyboard
Sebastian Notini - percussion
Stockholm Session Strings - musicians

Charts

Weekly charts

Year-end charts

References

2013 albums
Lisa Nilsson albums